Thomas Sanders (July 4, 1836 – March 21, 1874) was a Canadian merchant and political figure in Quebec. He represented Huntingdon in the Legislative Assembly of Quebec from 1871 to 1874 as a Conservative.

He was born in Covey Hill, Lower Canada and was educated there. Sanders was a captain in the local militia. In 1868, he married Andrian McNaughton. He served as mayor of Havelock. Sanders died in office at Havelock at the age of 37.

References
 

1836 births
1874 deaths
Conservative Party of Quebec MNAs
Mayors of places in Quebec
People from Montérégie